Petrus Fourie du Preez (born 24 March 1982) is a South African former professional rugby union player. He played as a scrum half for the Blue Bulls in the Currie Cup competition and the Bulls in Super Rugby between 2002 and 2011, and for Japanese Top League side Suntory Sungoliath between 2011 and 2016. He represented South Africa between 2004 and 2015, winning 76 caps, playing in three Rugby World Cup tournaments, and winning the 2007 competition.

Du Preez made his provincial debut during 2001 for the Blue Bulls in a match against the Leopards in the Currie Cup competition. It was in 2003 that he made his Super 12 (now, Super Rugby) debut for the Bulls side, against the ACT Brumbies. The following year he made his test match debut for the Springboks in a match against Ireland.

In 2006, Du Preez was voted SA Rugby Player of the year by the South African Rugby Football Union. He was nominated for IRB player of the year as well.

Du Preez has won the IRB u/21 World Cup in 2002, the Currie Cup final three times ('03, '04 & '09 having been withdrawn from Currie Cup action in '06 by the then Springbok coach Jake White when the Bulls shared the cup), won the Super 14 title in 2007, 2009 and 2010, the Tri-Nations in 2004 and 2009 and the 2007 Rugby World Cup.

In 2009, Du Preez was voted SA Rugby Player of the year by the South African Rugby Football Union for a second time.

Education
Du Preez was born in Pretoria and attended Afrikaanse Hoër Seunskool (Afrikaans High School for Boys, also known as Affies), a large public school in Pretoria. It was here that Du Preez got recognised as a star of the future alongside halfback partner and best friend, the late Francois Swart. He played alongside Bulls and Springboks teammates Wynand Olivier, Derick Kuun and Pierre Spies, Jacques-Louis Potgieter, Stormers lock Adriaan Fondse and former Stade Français lock Cliff Milton. Titans international cricketers AB de Villiers, Heino Kuhn and Faf du Plessis as well as New Zealand international Neil Wagner also teamed up with Du Preez in cricket.

2011 Rugby World Cup
Du Preez was selected for the second time for South Africa in the 2011 Rugby World Cup. The first match was against Wales which South Africa won with tries from François Steyn and one from Francois Hougaard which Du Preez set up. He was then taken off on 71 minutes against Fiji which the Boks won 49–3. Du Preez was then rested along with a host of other players for the game against Namibia to give fellow scrum-half Francois Hougaard some game time. South Africa won the game 87–0. South Africa then finished their group on top with a 13–5 victory over Samoa. In the knockout stage the Springboks were defeated by Australia.

2012-2013
Du Preez had his injured shoulder operated on late in 2011, and used most of 2013 to fully recover. To the delight of his Springbok fans, he was again selected for South Africa in the 2013 Rugby Championship and the 2013 end-of-year rugby union tests.

Accolades
In 2004 he was inducted into the University of Pretoria Sport Hall of Fame.

Honours 

South Africa Under-21
World Cup: 2002

Blue Bulls
Currie Cup: 2003, 2004, 2009

Bulls
Super Rugby: 2007, 2009, 2010

South Africa
World Cup: 2007
Tri-Nations: 2004, 2009

Suntory Sungoliath
All-Japan Rugby Football Championship: 2011–2012, 2012–2013, 2015–2016
2011–2012 Japan Cup

References

External links
 Profile on Bluebulls.co.za
 Profile on Sarugby.com

1982 births
Living people
Rugby union players from Pretoria
Afrikaner people
South African rugby union players
South Africa international rugby union players
Bulls (rugby union) players
Blue Bulls players
Tokyo Sungoliath players
Rugby union scrum-halves
University of Pretoria alumni
South African expatriate rugby union players
Expatriate rugby union players in Japan
South African expatriate sportspeople in Japan